The Night Safari, Singapore is the world's first nocturnal zoo located in Mandai, Singapore. One of the most popular tourist attractions in the country, it forms part of the Mandai Wildlife Reserve along with the River Wonders, Singapore Zoo and Jurong Bird Park.

The concept of a nocturnal park in Singapore was suggested in the 1980s by the former executive chairman of the Singapore Zoo, Dr Ong Swee Law. Constructed at a cost of S$63 million, the Night Safari was officially opened on 26 May 1994 and occupies  of secondary rainforest adjacent to the Singapore Zoo and Upper Seletar Reservoir.

The Night Safari currently houses over 900 animals representing over 100 species, of which 41% are threatened species. The Night Safari is managed by Mandai Wildlife Group, and about 1.3 million visitors visit the safari per year. The Night Safari received its 11 millionth visitor on 29 May 2007.

History

Unlike traditional nocturnal houses, which reverse the day-night cycle of animals so they will be active by day, the Night Safari is an entire open-air zoo set in a humid tropical forest that is only open at night. It is divided into six geographical zones, which can be explored either on foot via four walking trails, or by tram.

The animals of the Night Safari, ranging from axis deer and African buffalo to Indian rhinoceros and pangolins to lions and Asian elephants, are made visible by lighting that resembles moonlight.  Although it is brighter than full moonlight by a few orders of magnitude, it is dim enough not to disturb nocturnal and crepuscular animals' behaviour. London based lighting designer Simon Corder created the lighting for Night Safari.

The naturalistic enclosures simulate the animals' native habitat. Animals are separated from visitors with natural barriers, rather than caged, similar to the Singapore Zoo's open concept. Instead of vertical prison-like cages, cattle grids were laid all over the park to prevent hoofed animals from moving one habitat to another. These are grille-like metal sheets with gaps wide enough for animals' legs to go through. Moats were designed to look like streams and rivers to enable animals to be put on show in open areas, and hot wires were designed to look like twigs to keep animals away from the boundaries of their enclosures.
 
Food and beverage outlets in the Night Safari include Ulu Ulu Safari Restaurant, Bongo Burgers, and Casa Italia. Visitors can dine in the "Evening in the Wild" at Night Safari's only Tepee Tent. Also experience dining on the move with the Cocktail Safari Express and Gourmet Safari Express.

Exhibits

Tram Safari
The tram takes visitors across the whole park, allowing visitors to view most of the park's larger animals.

Asian elephant
Asiatic lion
Asian small-clawed otter
Axis deer
Barasingha
Bharal
Bornean bearded pig
Cape buffalo
Dhole
Eld's deer
Greater flamingo
Himalayan tahr
Hippopotamus
Indian hog deer
Indian muntjac
Indian rhinoceros
Malayan tapir
Markhor
North Sulawesi babirusa
Sambar deer
Sloth bear
Spotted hyena
Striped hyena
White lion

Fishing Cat Trail
The Fishing Cat Trail features a variety of nocturnal animals mostly from Asia, North Africa and South America.

Asian small-clawed otter
Barasingha
Binturong
Black-crowned night heron
Brazilian porcupine
Capybara
Fishing cat
Gharial
Giant Asian pond turtle
Giant anteater
Great cormorant
Gray-handed night monkey
Himalayan tahr
Indian muntjac
Kinkajou
Large flying fox
Little pied cormorant
Maned wolf
Southern three-banded armadillo
Spectacled owl
Spotted whistling duck
Striped hyena

Leopard Trail
The Leopard Trail houses a variety of nocturnal animals from the rainforests of Asia like clouded leopards, a flying fox walkthrough aviary, and habitats for some native animals. The Asiatic lions are also visible from a boardwalk on the edge of the trail.

Asian palm civet
Asian small-clawed otter
Asiatic lion
Binturong
Buffy fish owl
Clouded leopard
Collared owlet
Fossa
Giant pangasius
Greater hog badger
Indian crested porcupine
Indian rhinoceros
Large flying fox
Leopard cat
Lesser short-nosed fruit bat
Malayan porcupine
Masked palm civet
Senegal bushbaby
Small-toothed palm civet
Spotted wood owl
Spotted whistling duck
Sunda pangolin
Sunda scops owl
Sunda slow loris
Swamp eel

East Lodge Trail
This intriguing trail will lead you to the crossroad of Africa and Asia, where the animals of the savannah and the tropics live side by side.

Aardvark
Bongo
Hippopotamus
Malayan tiger
North Sulawesi babirusa
Northern white-faced owl
Red river hog
Spotted hyena

Tasmanian Devil Trail
Opening in 2012, this trail features a wallaby walkthrough habitat and smaller enclosures for other nocturnal Australian animals. The trail also has a large man-made cave called the Naracoorte Cave, a reconstruction of the Naracoorte Caves National Park, which has several indigenous paintings and holds invertebrates and reptiles.

Four female Tasmanian devils arrived from the Trowunna Wildlife Sanctuary in November 2022, part of an insurance population managed ny the Save the Tasmanian Devil Programme run by the Tasmanian Department of Natural Resources and Environment.

Asian forest scorpion
Cave racer
Chilean rosehair tarantula
Common brushtail possum
Common barn owl
Crested gecko
Madagascar hissing cockroach
Mexican fireleg tarantula
Morepork
Red-necked wallaby
Tasmanian devil
Woylie

Creatures of the Show

Asian small-clawed otter
Binturong
Bornean bearded pig
Buffy fish owl
Common raccoon
Fennec fox
Indian crested porcupine
Raccoon dog
Turkey vulture

Shows
The "Creatures of the Night Show" is a performance presented by the animals in the Night Safari. A binturong shows off its ability to hang upside down with its prehensile tail, a spotted hyena displays its powerful jaws and otters spread awareness to recycle reusable items.

Cultural performances are a regular feature at the safari, and include tribal dances, blowpipe demonstrations and fire eating displays.

Gallery

Awards

 ASEAN Tourism Association – Aseanta Awards For Excellence (1995)
 Best New Attraction in ASEAN
 Singapore Tourism Awards
 Top 10 Best Family Experience (2006)
 Best Leisure Attraction Experience (2003, 2004, 2006)
 Leisure Attraction of the Year (1996, 1997, 1999, 2000)
 Best Trail Marshall of the Year, Mohammed Munzir Aziz. (2008)
 Best Trail Marshall of the Year, Mohammad Ridhwan Shahril. (2009)
 Best Ground crew of the Year, Vijayeswaran Visvalingam. (2009)
 Best Animal Caretaker of the Year, Hadi Akmal (2015)

Transportation
Night Safari is not served directly by any MRT line, with the nearest station being Springleaf MRT station which opened on 28 August 2021.

There are three bus services operated by SBS Transit and SMRT and Tower Transit which calls at the zoo or passing by. Bus service 138 and 927 from Ang Mo Kio and Choa Chu Kang respectively calls a bus stop at the zoo. Bus service 171 plies the road along Mandai Road and not into the zoo.

Bus
A shuttle service, known as the Mandai Khatib Shuttle, plies daily between Khatib MRT station and the Zoo. A one-way trip cost $1 for everyone above the age of three.

References

 Lin Xinyi, "Night Safari: From trailblazer to tourism icon", The Straits Times, 31 May 2007

External links

 Night Safari official website
 Map of Night Safari

Safari parks
Tourist attractions in Singapore
Zoos in Singapore
1994 establishments in Singapore
Zoos established in 1994